The 24th Annual D.I.C.E. Awards is the 24th edition of the D.I.C.E. Awards ("Design Innovate Communicate Entertain"), an annual awards event that honors the best games in the video game industry. The awards were arranged by the Academy of Interactive Arts & Sciences (AIAS), and were held on April 22, 2021. Due to the COVID-19 pandemic, the event was held virtually. Winners of the D.I.C.E. Awards are determined by ballot of industry experts and AIAS members. The show was hosted by Greg Miller, Jessica Chobot, and Kahlief Adams. The nominees were announced on January 26, 2021. It was originally scheduled for April 8.

The Last of Us Part II and its developer Naughty Dog received the most nominations, and Hades and its developer Supergiant Games won the most awards, including Game of the Year. Ghost of Tsushima and its developer Sucker Punch Productions came in second in both receiving the most nominations and awards won. Sony Interactive Entertainment was the most-nominated and awarded publisher.

This was also the first year that no Special Awards were handed out.

Winners and Nominees
Winners are listed first, highlighted in boldface, and indicated with a double dagger.

Games with multiple nominations and awards

The following 20 games received multiple nominations:

The following three games received multiple awards:

Companies with multiple nominations

Companies that received multiple nominations as either a developer or a publisher.

Companies that received multiple awards as either a developer or a publisher.

External links
 
 Finalists Revealed

References

2021 awards
2021 awards in the United States
April 2021 events in the United States
2020 in video gaming
D.I.C.E. Award ceremonies